Gordon Ramsay Hell's Kitchen is a multi-national fine dining restaurant chain, owned by British chef Gordon Ramsay, and based on the reality TV show Hell's Kitchen. As of early 2023 the chain consists of five USA locations and one in Dubai.

History

Ramsay was featured in the 2005 reality TV program Hell's Kitchen in the US and in 2018 launched a chain of theme restaurants inspired by the show.

US-based restaurants are operated by Gordon Ramsay North America (GRNA) division, which is headquartered in the Dallas–Fort Worth metroplex. The US locations include Las Vegas,  Lake Tahoe, Southern California, Atlantic City, and Washington, D.C. The next location is planned for Miami in mid-2023.

In November 2018 a location opened at Caesars Palace Bluewaters Dubai. The location accommodates 260 diners with indoor and outdoor seating. The location is operated by the Europe-based Gordon Ramsay Restaurant group.

Television show tie-ins
The restaurants feature design elements from the television show, such as the HK logo and pitchfork door handles, and branded merchandise is available. Cocktail names reference the show.

The 19th and 20th seasons of Hell's Kitchen were filmed at the Caesars Entertainment Studios property near the Las Vegas Strip, but for some scenes in those episodes the contestants visited the restaurant in Vegas.

In an August 2022 interview with the San Diego Union-Tribune, Ramsay spoke of how the menu at his Hell's Kitchen restaurants was based on the Hell's Kitchen television program, utilizing "what’s stayed on the menu for the past 21 seasons to test the contestants on the series"; he also commented that "It’s clear that some dishes have become TV favorites, which are easily adaptable to the restaurant." When the newspaper asked him, "How will dining at Hell’s Kitchen be different from what people see on the TV show?," Ramsay replied, "To start, you’re guaranteed to get fed!"

Reception
In a rundown of various Las Vegas restaurants for the Toronto Sun, Rita DeMontis wrote, "I found the whole Hell’s Kitchen experience exhilarating – from service to the various dishes to an eye-popping dessert...Awesome seating gives you a bird’s eye-view of the strip." In her list of Las Vegas' "30 best restaurants" for Tasting Table, Allie Lebos said "the experience does not disappoint - as long as you're not expecting a meal filled with chaos and insults". The Gayot Guidebooks website gives the Hell's Kitchen on the Las Vegas Strip a rating of 13 points out of 20 ("Good").

See also
 List of restaurants owned or operated by Gordon Ramsay
 Lists of restaurants

References

Companies based in the Dallas–Fort Worth metroplex
Fine dining
Restaurant chains
Restaurant chains in the United States
Restaurants established in 2018
2018 establishments in the United States
Hell's Kitchen (American TV series)
Restaurants in the Las Vegas Valley
Restaurants in Dubai
Restaurants in Nevada
Restaurants in San Diego County, California
Restaurants in Atlantic City, New Jersey